Brian Kennedy is a British businessman that has founded and sold several companies in the home improvement and energy sectors, in both the US and UK. He was also previously the majority owner of the Sale Sharks Rugby Union Club.

According to The Sunday Times Rich List in 2019, Kennedy is worth £275 million.

Early life
Kennedy grew up in Edinburgh, Scotland and attended Tynecastle High School. He studied civil engineering at Heriot-Watt University before dropping out to work in various sales and accountancy positions, including one at Brown Brothers. He then moved to London in 1981 for a management position after winning a position there through a sales competition.

Business
In 1988 Kennedy was a shareholder in Farouche Cuisines, which was sold to British Electric Traction. Kennedy received one million pounds during the deal. He formed Latium Enterprises, a conglomerate spanning manufacturing, retail and communication. In 1995 Kennedy founded the company Genesis Communications. The company was mobile phone contract services provider for SMEs. The company was sold in 2004 to Dixons for £31million. During its final year before the sale, the company had £51million in sales and a profit of £2million.

In 1999 Kennedy purchased Carradon windows from Caradon Group PLC, which consisted of double glazing manufacturer Everest, Duraflex plastic extrusions, Celuform extrusions, Wendland roofs and CET glass manufacturing. He then sold the companies off over several years. In 2012 his company Latium Holdings also merged with Epwin Holdings, creating a £275m turnover enterprise with a staff of 2500, which was jointly owned by Kennedy and Jim Rawson. Epwin priced an IPO on 15 July 2014 with a market capitalisation of GBP135 million. In 2006 Kennedy led a takeover of Ultraframe.

Epwin priced an IPO on 15 July 2014 with a market capitalisation of GBP135 million. In 2006 Kennedy led a takeover of Ultraframe. Brian was the majority shareholder of Entu (UK) Limited until its flotation on the London Stock Exchange (AIM) in October 2014. Brian retained a 30% stake in the company following the flotation, which was renamed Entu (UK) PLC. The company heads a group of home improvement companies including Zenith Staybrite, Job Worth Doing, Weatherseal, Penicuik and Europlas. At the time of the flotation Entu (UK) had a market capitalisation of £66 million. In property sales, Kennedy is the founder of Patrick Properties, a real-estate company based in Cheshire, which owns commercial, residential, and industrial properties.

Kennedy has invested in wind energy companies. This includes the firm Kennedy Renewables, and the Little Raith wind farm. He is chairman and owner of Latium Enterprises. including Latium Tech investments which in 2016 became the majority shareholder in Connex One the global software business, which very recently raised £93M in Series C fundraising from GP Bullhound. Other ventures of his include the Building Plastics Holdings group, Quantal, and Four Seasons Sunrooms, which is one of the largest sunroom companies in the country, and Vitapod, a US-based healthy drinks company.

Entertainment
Kennedy was previously the majority owner and chairman of the Sale Sharks Rugby Union Club. The club was originally owned under his company Genesis, however Kennedy transferred club ownership to himself in the early 2000s to facilitate the sale of Genesis. During his tenure as owner, they were the Premiership champions in 2006.

In the past he owned Stockport County and purchased their Edgeley Park ground. He has also made unsuccessful bids to purchase both the Edinburgh Hibernian F.C. and Rangers F.C. In 2014 Kennedy co-financed and co-produced the Tommy Lee Jones film The Homesman. In 2015 Kennedy co-financed and co-produced the film The Great Gilly Hopkins (film).

Philanthropy
Kennedy is the founder of the eponymous Brian Kennedy Trust, which makes charitable donations and takes up philanthropic causes in the UK. The Trust was set up in 2008, and with groups including the Cheshire police and Space4autism.Kennedy is an investor in Ryboquin, which is involved in the progress development of gene therapy treatments for cancer and other diseases.

He has also worked with the family of Madeleine McCann to try to find her after her disappearance in 2007.

References

Living people
Sale Sharks
British businesspeople in retailing
British philanthropists
British film producers
Year of birth missing (living people)
Businesspeople from Edinburgh
Alumni of Heriot-Watt University
People educated at Tynecastle High School